The DRG Class 99.10, formerly the Palatine Class Pts 3/3 H of the Palatinate Railway, was a German narrow gauge steam locomotive. It was the superheated version of the PtS 3/3 N. Unlike the saturated steam version the upper section of these engines was no longer glazed, otherwise they were broadly identical. They could carry up to 2.0 m3 of water and 1.2 t of coal.

They were retired on 19 April 1956 and 16 August 1957.

See also 
 Royal Bavarian State Railways
 Palatinate Railway
 List of Bavarian locomotives and railbuses
 List of Palatine locomotives and railbuses

References

0-6-0T locomotives
Metre gauge steam locomotives
Pts 3 3 H
Railway locomotives introduced in 1923
Krauss locomotives
C h2t locomotives